Frank Müller-Rosentritt (born 13 June 1982) is a German politician of the Free Democratic Party (FDP) who has been serving as a member of the Bundestag from the state of Saxony since 2017.

Political career 
From 2019 to 2021, Müller-Rosentritt served as chairman of the FDP in Saxony.

In the negotiations to form a so-called traffic light coalition of the Social Democratic Party (SPD), the Green Party and the FDP following the 2021 federal elections, Müller-Rosentritt was part of his party's delegation in the working group on foreign policy, defence, development cooperation and human rights, co-chaired by Heiko Maas, Omid Nouripour and Alexander Graf Lambsdorff.

References

External links 

  
 Bundestag biography 

 

1982 births
Living people
Members of the Bundestag for Saxony
Members of the Bundestag 2021–2025
Members of the Bundestag 2017–2021
Members of the Bundestag for the Free Democratic Party (Germany)